Cold Stone Creamery is an American international ice cream parlor chain. Headquartered in Scottsdale, Arizona, the company is owned and operated by Kahala Brands. The company's main product is premium ice cream made with approximately 12–14% butterfat, made on location and customized for patrons at time of order. Cold Stone has also expanded its menu with other ice cream-related products, including: ice cream cakes, pies, cookie sandwiches, smoothies, shakes, and iced or blended coffee drinks. Since 2008, the company has been co-branding its locations with other chains in an attempt to increase its presence outside the United States, and transform its business model from seasonal to year-round. There are about 1,300 locations in 20 countries worldwide.

History

The company was co-founded in 1988 by Donald and Susan Sutherland, who sought ice cream that was neither hard packed nor soft-serve.  Cold Stone Creamery opened its first store that year in Tempe, Arizona. The original Cold Stone Creamery, store #0001, is in operation today near the same intersection (southwest corner of McClintock & Southern) as the original Tempe location. The store moved from the original location to the current location in the early 1990s.

The company has maintained the same concept created by Steve Herrell who founded Steve's Ice Cream. Patrons first select what flavor of ice cream they would like and then choose from a number of mix-ins to be folded into the ice cream. Mix-ins include candies, nuts, brownies and syrups. Cold Stone derives its name from the frozen granite slab that employees use to fold mix-ins into the ice cream.

In 1995, Cold Stone Creamery opened its first franchise store in Tempe, Arizona. Shortly after, a second location (first out of state) was opened in Camarillo, California. Cold Stone Creamery is now the sixth best-selling brand of ice cream in the US. In 2008, Cold Stone opened its first European franchise in Copenhagen, Denmark. Three more stores were later opened in other parts of the country. In January 2006, the company was named the 11th fastest-growing franchise by Entrepreneur magazine. In June 2009, the company opened its first locations in Canada. As of 2012, three stores had opened in Singapore. In 2012, Cold Stone opened its first store in Nigeria, the first in Sub-Saharan Africa. On January 3, 2020, Cold Stone Creamery announced that it would close its doors on January 31, 2020 in Singapore. In March 2015, Cold Stone opened its first location in Turkey's capital Ankara. In 2015 Cold Stone Creamery opened its first location in El Salvador in Multiplaza Mall. As of 2021, all stores in Dhaka in Bangladesh were closed. As of 2019 there are 21 stores across India.

In May 2007, Cold Stone Creamery merged with Kahala Corp to form Kahala-Cold Stone, which collectively owns 13 brands. Doug Ducey, who had served as president and CEO of Cold Stone Creamery since 1995, and later Governor of Arizona, was named CEO of the newly established company. Kevin Blackwell, the former CEO of Kahala, became chairman of the board and chief strategist. However, in September 2007, Ducey announced he was leaving the company. Blackwell was named CEO. In 2013, the Serruya family, based in Toronto, Ontario, purchased a majority interest in Kahala and changed the name to Kahala Brands to better align with the focus of the business.

Co-Branding 
The parent company of Cold Stone Creamery, Kahala Brands, announced in February 2009 that it had reached an agreement with Canadian coffee shop chain Tim Hortons to open up 100 co-branded stores in the United States after successfully testing two locations in Rhode Island. The strategic alliance was intended to pave the way for Tim Hortons to operate in more US locations while allowing Cold Stone Creamery to expand into Canada. The most notable co-branded store opened in August 2009 when Tim Hortons moved into three Cold Stone Creamery locations in New York City, including its flagship Times Square location.

In June 2009, Cold Stone Creamery started testing the Canadian market by opening seven co-branded locations with Tim Hortons in Toronto, Oakville, Mississauga, Hamilton, Pickering, Sudbury, and Halifax, Nova Scotia. They had locations in every Canadian province except for Newfoundland and Labrador.

The Tim Hortons venture followed on the footsteps of a similar co-branding efforts in 2007 and 2008, but ended in 2014. Cold Stone franchisees in New York City began partnering with Soup Kitchen International to sell soup in their stores beginning in late 2007. In 2008, the company signed an agreement with the Rocky Mountain Chocolate Factory to open seven locations in the Western US. The venture is designed to bring in customers on a year-round basis as opposed to the seasonal draws that each company experiences. The mingling of Cold Stone and Rocky Mountain led to more than 10% increase in weekly sales in Rocky Mountain stores after co-branding.

Products 
There are four serving sizes. Also offered are milkshakes and smoothies, among them the Cold Stone PB&C; its large size was designated by Men's Health Magazine as the most unhealthy drink in the United States for two consecutive years. The drink has 2,010 calories, 131 grams of fat with 68 grams saturated fat, and 153 grams of sugar. 

Cold Stone Creamery: Scoop It Up, a simulation video game developed by Zoo Publishing, was released for the Wii in 2009.

Licensing 

Cold Stone has entered into partnerships with other companies to promote brand name products inside its stores. The first major partnership the company entered into was with Kraft Foods for its Jell-O brand in 2009. Cold Stone introduced a series of flavors of ice cream based on popular Jell-O pudding flavors; Chocolate, Butterscotch, Banana, and Vanilla. Because the pudding additives cause the ice cream to gel, it was recently noted that these flavors do not melt.

Externally, a 2008 licensing agreement with Jelly Belly had a line of jelly beans flavored like some of Cold Stone's most popular ice cream flavors.

Legal issues 
There have been allegations by independent franchises that Cold Stone's business practices have put them at a competitive disadvantage. These former franchises claim that the parent company opens locations too close to each other, requires expensive remodeling and overstates potential revenues and income. Other franchises have contended that is not the case and that they are experiencing growth amid financial uncertainties and higher costs associated with fuel and energy prices.

In June 2008, The Wall Street Journal examined the issue. The article stated that a large number of locations, approximately 16–20%, of Cold Stone Creamery franchises have closed or were put up for sale by their owners, many of whom had suffered significant financial losses due to their investment. The article included claims by franchisees that the company had misrepresented the average revenues of Cold Stone stores and acted in ways that reduced stores' profit margins. A company spokeswoman said that the number of stores for sale was "at par with industry expectations" in light of "the economically challenging times."

CNBC documentary and lawsuit
In December 2010 lawyers from Cold Stone Creamery threatened a lawsuit over some of the contents of a then-upcoming documentary by CNBC.

Behind the Counter: The Untold Story of Franchising reported on the failures and successes of franchising. After several edits the program was broadcast on CNBC on March 21, 2011. Brands such as Dunkin' Donuts and Five Guys were highlighted as successful franchise brands. Cold Stone Creamery's executives and corporate lawyers were interviewed. The lawsuit was discussed with former franchisees and the litigation threats with CNBC. An apparently successful Cold Stone franchise was also featured. Another expose was not aired due to threats of litigation and stores that were closed for years appeared on search engines for some unknown reason.

Corporate headquarters
While the company was originally headquartered in Tempe, in 1997 the company moved its headquarters to Scottsdale, Arizona. In July 2005 Cold Stone moved into its current headquarters. The two-story building has classroom space, a product development laboratory kitchen, and a training store.

References

External links

 
 Interview with Ray Karam, Senior Tastemaster, Cold Stone Creamery, Pursue The Passion, 18 April 2010.

Ice cream parlors
Fast-food franchises
Fast-food chains of the United States
Companies based in Scottsdale, Arizona
American companies established in 1988
Restaurants established in 1988
1988 establishments in Arizona
Ice cream brands
Kahala Brands
2007 mergers and acquisitions
Arizona culture